The Circle of Concerned African Women Theologians is a pan-African ecumenical organization supporting scholarly research of African women theologians. The Circle serves to mentor the next generation of African women theologians throughout their academic careers in order to counter the dearth of academic theological literature by African women. The Circle has chapters in more than a dozen countries across the African continent, as well as diaspora chapters in Europe and North America.

History 
The organization was formally established in 1989 at Trinity College in Legon, Ghana, with 79 founding members convened by the Ghanaian theologian Mercy Oduyoye. Oduyoye contends it informally began in 1976 when she invited female scholars of theology and religion to join the Ecumenical Association of Third World Theologians. However, quota limits hindered these activities, which gave a stimulus for ultimately establishing the Circle. The official launch in 1989 was as "a culmination of a decade-long work and the realisation that while women were the majority in faith-based organisations, they were visibly absent in religious leadership and academic study of religion." Oduyoye was working at the World Council of Churches at the time of founding. Hence, the group awarded the WCC its Appreciation of Partnership Award at its 5th pan-African conference in 2019 "because the WCC created the space in which the Circle of Concerned African Women Theologians was born and flourished."

The Circle has highlighted issues related to sexuality, including concerns around violence against women and the HIV/AIDS epidemic. It has published over 30 books by group authorship and several single-author monographs written by Circle members. The Circle was also instrumental in establishing a research center for women, religion and culture in Accra, Ghana, and a women's resource center in Limurua, Kenya. According to the World Council of Churches, the Circle has "contributed research and writing that has added immeasurably to the ecumenical movement, particularly in the area of gender justice."

In July 2019, the Circle celebrated its 30th anniversary at its 5th pan-African conference at the University of Botswana in Gaborone. The four-day conference was held on the theme "Mother Earth, Mother Africa in Religious Imagination" and was attended by scholars from 17 countries. At the anniversary celebration, founder Mercy Oduyoye noted that the Circle's first meeting was held in 1980, but that it was officially launched in 1989. At the time, Oduyoye said, there was only one women serving as a representative in the synod of her church, even though 80 percent of the congregants in churches were women. Keynote speaker Puleng LenkaBula added that the work of the Circle did not only acknowledge "the evil of oppression in our societies, but also the injustice of colonialism of our bodies and of the earth." For LenkaBula, the Circle represents "a contestation and a call for justice, but also a path that feminist and womanist theologians came to shape the narratives that were often muted in church and society."

Notable women from the Circle
Brigalia Bam
Musa Dube
Musimbi Kanyoro
Esther Mombo
Nyambura Njoroge
Mercy Amba Oduyoye
Isabel Apawo Phiri
Fulata Moyo
Teresia Mbari Hinga
Mary Getui

See also
EATWOT

References

Further reading 

 
 

World Christianity
Christianity in Africa